Christophe de Longueil (1490 – September 11, 1522) was a humanist from the Duchy of Brabant. He is also known by his Latin name, Christophorus Longolius.

He was born in Mechelen, and studied jurisprudence in Valence. He became a lawyer in 1511, and served from 1513 as an official in Paris.  He also served as a tutor to a young King Francis I of France. He had given up law to study classical literature.  Later he  traveled around Europe, finally settling in Padua, where he died in 1522.

References

 

1490 births
1522 deaths
Flemish Renaissance humanists
French male non-fiction writers